Ex rel. is an abbreviation of the Latin phrase "ex relatione (meaning "[arising] out of the relation/narration [of the relator]" ). The term is a legal phrase; the legal citation guide, the Bluebook, describes ex rel. as a "procedural phrase" and requires using it to abbreviate "on the relation of", "for the use of", "on behalf of", and similar expressions.

It is most commonly used when a government brings a cause of action upon the request of a private party who has some interest in the matter. The private party is called the relator in such a case. The government acts on the basis of the narration or recounting (Latin relatione) of the alleged facts by the relator. Governments typically accept applications and commence litigation for ex rel. actions only if the interest advanced by the private party is similar to the interest of the government.

New York has a "forever wild" constitutional article, which is enforceable by action of the New York State Attorney General or by any citizen ex rel. with the consent of the Appellate Division.

The term can also be used when a relative or party in privity brings suit on another person's behalf. For example, the Terri Schiavo appeal to the United States Supreme Court was titled Schiavo ex rel. Schindler v. Schiavo.

References

Latin legal terminology